Clomifenoxide (INN), also known as clomifene N-oxide, is a nonsteroidal selective estrogen receptor modulator (SERM) of the triphenylethylene group that is described as an antiestrogen and "gonad stimulant" and was never marketed. It is an active metabolite of clomifene.

See also
 Afimoxifene
 Endoxifen

References

Human drug metabolites
Organochlorides
Progonadotropins
Selective estrogen receptor modulators
Triphenylethylenes
Amine oxides